Brij Bhushan Sharan Singh (born 8 January 1957) is an Indian politician from Bharatiya Janata Party who is currently serving as the member of parliament from Kaiserganj.

Political career 
In 1991 he was elected to the 10th Lok Sabha from Gonda constituency in Uttar Pradesh as Bharatiya Janata Party candidate. He was re-elected to the 13th Lok Sabha in 1999 from the same constituency and in 2004, he was re-elected to 14th Lok Sabha from Balrampur constituency in Uttar Pradesh state on the BJP ticket. On 20 July 2008, he joined the Samajwadi Party. In 2009, he was re-elected to 15th Lok Sabha from Kaiserganj constituency in Uttar Pradesh state. He later joined the Bharatiya Janata Party months before the 16th general election and is currently member of 17th Lok Sabha from BJP. He is the President of Wrestling Federation of India (WFI).

Controversy
In Jan 2023, Brij Bhushan Sharan Singh was accused of mental torture and sexual harassment by a group of Olympians and international wrestlers including Vinesh Phogat, Sakshi Malik and others.
In 1992, He was involved in Babri Masjid Demolition Case, due to which he was arrested by CBI along with 39 other people. He being the prime suspect, was later given clean sheet by Supreme Court Of India in 2020.

Early life and education
Brij Bhushan Sharan Singh was born on January 8, 1957, to Shri Jagdamba Sharan Singh and Smt. Pyari Devi Singh.

References

External links
 Detailed profile: Brij Bhushan Sharan Singh in India.gov.in website
 personal website

1957 births
Living people
Samajwadi Party politicians
People from Gonda, Uttar Pradesh
India MPs 2004–2009
People from Balrampur district
India MPs 1991–1996
India MPs 1999–2004
India MPs 2009–2014
Lok Sabha members from Uttar Pradesh
Indian Hindus
India MPs 2014–2019
Bharatiya Janata Party politicians from Uttar Pradesh
People from Bahraich district
India MPs 2019–present